Anthidium psoraleae is a species of bee in the family Megachilidae, the leaf-cutter, carder, or mason bees.

Distribution
North America

References

External links
Images

psoraleae
Insects described in 1902